Wienerschnitzel is an American fast food chain founded in 1961 (as "Der Wienerschnitzel") that specializes in hot dogs. Despite the name, the company does not sell Wiener schnitzel, only selling it once as a promotional item. Wienerschnitzel locations are found predominantly in California and Texas, though others are located in Arizona, Colorado, Illinois, Louisiana, New Mexico, Nevada, Utah, and Washington. Outside the 50 states, there is a store located in Guam and one in Panama.

The chain is recognizable by the A-frame-style roofs of its older restaurants, similar to the original structures used by IHOP, Tastee-Freez, Nickerson Farms, and Whataburger. Structures that have been converted from Wienerschnitzels into other restaurants often retain the distinctive architecture. The chain's advertising mascot is an anthropomorphized hot dog known as The Delicious One, who runs from people who want to eat him.

Wienerschnitzel sponsors the tongue-in-cheek Wiener Nationals, the de facto national dachshund racing championship series for the United States.

History
The first Wienerschnitzel was founded by former Taco Bell employee John Galardi. When Galardi came to California at the age of 19, he landed his first job from Glen Bell, who would go on to later establish Taco Bell in 1962. Bell initially hired him on a part-time basis for 50 cents an hour at a taco store called Taco-Tia. Eventually, Galardi entered into a partnership agreement to run the store. At one point, Bell borrowed $6,000 from Galardi but was unable to pay the loan back. He offered to sell the store to Galardi for $12,000. Galardi borrowed some money from his parents, laid off all of the employees at the restaurant and worked alone, and eventually secured enough money to purchase the store.

A couple of years later, a man wanted to recruit Galardi to start his own restaurant at a location on Pacific Coast Highway in Wilmington, next to one of Bell's taco stores. Bell encouraged him to take the man up on the offer, but to sell another kind of food. Galardi decided to sell hot dogs since "nobody else was in hot dogs." According to Galardi, his wife came up with the name when looking through a cookbook. He was initially sceptical of the name, saying, "I told my wife going home nobody in their right mind would call a company Wienerschnitzel. Three days later, I said, 'Hell, it's better than John's Hot Dogs.'"  The first location was opened in 1961 as a hot-dog stand at 900 West Pacific Coast Highway, east of Figueroa Street, in the Los Angeles community of Wilmington.

In the late 1980s, Galardi converted several stores in the Denver area and other Western cities into Hamburger Stand restaurants. Wienerschnitzels now sell Tastee-Freez ice cream, a brand also owned by Galardi.

John Galardi died of pancreatic cancer on April 13, 2013. His ex-wife, Cynthia Galardi-Culpepper, who previously was a silent partner, assumed the role as CEO and chairwoman after his passing. She was the corporation's first and only woman in a managerial position and appeared as an Undercover Boss in 2016.

In 2015, the company signed a franchise agreement with International Food Concepts Inc. to plan and open Wienerschnitzel locations in Panama.

Etymology

"Der Wienerschnitzel" is an example of incorrect use of German by native English speakers.

The expression Wienerschnitzel is German, spelled as a one-word compound as was the standard before the spelling reform of 1996 and is still the standard in Switzerland; however, the correct article to use in this case is the neuter form das, not the masculine der. This is true for both the actual food (das Schnitzel) and the restaurant itself (das Restaurant, das Lokal).

In English, "wiener" (short for "wienerwurst"), from Wiener Würstchen, is a colloquial name for a hot dog. The specific phrase Wiener Schnitzel itself, however, denotes a "Viennese breaded veal cutlet", something the restaurant chain has only served briefly as a limited menu item (in 2017).

The chain changed its name to "Wienerschnitzel" (sans article) in 1977, though many franchises retained the older name on their restaurants and many older customers still refer to the chain as "Der Wienerschnitzel". The restaurant paid homage to its original name in its 2009 marketing slogan, "DERlicious".

Logo, slogans, and advertising
Soon after the name change, the current Wienerschnitzel "W" logo was created by graphic designer Saul Bass in 1978.

The Delicious One (sometimes referred to as TDO), Wienerschnitzel's mascot, has been featured in some advertising since 1999. The slogan, "The World's Most Wanted Wiener" is used in all of The Delicious One's commercials. The new commercials are more focused on describing their food products and are produced in live-action.

Wienerschnitzel uses the slogan "DERlicious" in advertising, alluding to the time before the company dropped the "Der" from its name in 1977. Some other newer commercials use the slogan, "Hot Dogs are DER again!" along with the DERlicious logo.

In celebration of Wienerschnitzel's 50th anniversary, a new slogan was released in 2011 to continue the "Der" theme: "Der fun since '61!".

The history of Wienerschnitzel's slogans, with the years they were used, are:
 "Der fun since '61!" (2011–present, in celebration of the 50th anniversary of the business)
 "DERlicious", "Hot Dogs are DER again" (2009)
 "Pushing the Boundaries of Taste." (2006–2008)
 "Chili Dog Diet." (2005–2006) Chili Yum, Chili Chili, Yum, Yum!
 "The World's Most Wanted Wiener" (1999–2005 as main slogan, now used only in The Delicious One commercials)
 "Everyone loves a wiener!" (1996–1999)
 "Wiener dude attitude!" (1991–1996)
 "We're not just a hot dog anymore!" (1984–1991)
 "Hamburgers and hot dogs, it's all together now!" (1977–1980)
 "Just thinkin' about those hot dogs makes me hungry!" (1974–1977)
 "The Hot Dog Place with the Bright Red Roof" (early 1970s)
 "Der fixin's are derlightful / there's fun in every bite-ful" (late 1960s)

The Galardi Group

History
The Galardi Group, the parent of Wienerschnitzel, Tastee-Freez and Hamburger Stand, was formed by John Galardi in 1970. 

In 1979, Wienerschnitzel attempted to broaden its offerings and added hamburgers to its menus. However, with little success into the 1980s, the company (which was eventually renamed to the Galardi Group) started two new chains in 1983, The Original Hamburger Stand and Weldon's gourmet hamburgers (which was cast off in the 1990s). Poorly performing Wienerschnitzel locations were replaced with The Original Hamburger Stands in locations such as the Denver area.

By 2003, the Galardi Group became a franchisee of Tastee-Freez and made Tastee-Freez products available in its restaurants, Wienerschnitzel and Original Hamburger Stand. The Galardi Group was so pleased with the increased sales at its restaurant that it bought the Tastee-Freez company that year.

In popular culture 
The Descendents' song "Weinerschnitzel" from their 1981 release Fat EP takes the form of a satirical skit in which the band's frontman Milo Aukerman orders a meal from the restaurant.

The chain is also mentioned by Sophia in The Golden Girls episode “And Ma Makes Three” (Season 3, Episode 20).

See also
 List of hot dog restaurants

References

External links

Companies based in Irvine, California
Restaurants in Orange County, California
Economy of the Southwestern United States
Regional restaurant chains in the United States
Fast-food chains of the United States
1961 establishments in California
Restaurants established in 1961
Fast-food hamburger restaurants
Hot dog restaurants
Cuisine of the Western United States